Johann Koehnken (born September 14, 1819 – 1897) was an American organ builder in Cincinnati, Ohio who worked under Matthias Schwab (1808-1862) and with Gallus Grimm (1827-1897). Their organs remain in use (with restoration work) at the Isaac M. Wise Temple (formerly Plum Street Temple) and other locations.

Much of Matthias Schwab's personal life remains a mystery. He arrived in Cincinnati in 1831 and in 1860 he apparently relinquished ownership of his factory at Sycamore and Schiller to Johann Heinrich Koehnken who was assisted by Gallus Grimm.

Koehnken was born on a farm in Altenbuhlstedt in the Lower Saxony area of Germany (not far from Bremen) and was apprenticed to a cabinetmaker. He worked as a cabinet maker for two years in Germany and two more in Wheeling before coming to Cincinnati in 1839. He "found his way to the door of Matthias Schwab", who had trained as an organ builder in Germany and operated a "highly regarded organ works in the fast-growing river town of Cincinnati."

When Schwab retired in 1860, Koehnken and Grimm, a German-trained organ builder, continued the tradition and the firm became Koehnken and Company. Grimm partnered with Koehnken from 1875 and the firm became Koehnken & Grimm. They worked together for twenty-one years until Koehnken retired in 1896.  In 1897 both Koehnken and Grimm died.

Grimm started working at the shop in 1853, having served as an apprentice to German organ builder Martin Braun for four years. The official name was changed to Koehnken & Grimm in 1876.

Organs
St. John Lutheran Church in Chehalis, Washington has a Koehnken and Grimm organ from 1895. It was relocated from St. Mary's Catholic Church in Shawnee, Ohio before that building was demolished.
St. John's United Church of Christ in Madison, Indiana 
Isaac M. Wise Temple (formerly Plum Street Temple) in Cincinnati, Ohio has a Koehnken organ.
 Holy Family Catholic Church. It was relocated from Our Lady of Perpetual Help in Sedamsville to Holy Family in Price Hill.

John Rimmer inherited the business?

References

1819 births
1897 deaths
National Register of Historic Places in Cincinnati
American pipe organ builders
Musical instrument manufacturing companies of the United States